The Battle of Yerbas Buenas developed during the Chilean War of Independence on April 27, 1813. It is also known as the Surprise of Yerbas Buenas.

In the battle, the Chilean forces, under the command of Colonel Juan de Dios Puga, and the Spanish forces, under the command of Brigadier Antonio Pareja, confronted each other.

The battle began when, in the middle of the night, the Chileans let loose on the Spanish soldiers that were camping in the village of Yerbas Buenas, near Linares. In the beginning, the dark favored the Chileans, who created confusion among the Spanish troops and almost won the battle but just at the light of day, the Spanish realized that they were greater in number than the Chileans, and launched an attack. A third of the Chilean patriots were killed; among these were Lieutenant Enrique Ross and Colonel Juan de Dios Puga.

With great difficulty, the survivors, directed by Captain Santiago Bueras, managed to escape the Spanish attack and reach the base in Talca to inform General Carrera that the Spanish forces were nearing them.

External links

Conflicts in 1813
Battles involving Chile
Battles involving Spain
Battles of the Spanish American wars of independence
Battles of the Chilean War of Independence
Battles of the Patria Vieja Campaign
History of Maule Region
1813 in the Captaincy General of Chile
April 1813 events